The bilateral relations between the Republic of India and the Republic of Trinidad and Tobago have considerably expanded in recent years with both nations building strategic and commercial ties. Both nations formally established diplomatic relations in 1962. Indo-Trinidadian and Tobagonians form the largest ethnic group in the country at 37.6% of the total population.

Background
Both nations were colonised by the British Empire; India supported independence of Trinidad and Tobago from colonial rule and established its diplomatic mission in 1962 - the year that Trinidad and Tobago officially gained independence from British rule. Trinidad and Tobago's largest ethnic group is citizens of Indian descent. The nations possess diverse natural and economic resources and are the largest economies in their respective regions. Both are members of the United Nations, Commonwealth of Nations, G-77 and the Non-Aligned Movement.

Migration

To Trinidad and Tobago
The relationship between India and Trinidad and Tobago started on 30 May 1845, when the Fatel Razack brought 225 indentured labourers to Trinidad from India. Today, 37% of Trinidad and Tobago's population are of pure Indian descent. That number is slightly higher when including multiracial individuals, mostly Dougla people.

Recent relations
In 2010, Indian nationals can now travel to Trinidad and Tobago without a visa and can visit up to 90 days. There has also been initiatives by the Government of India to provide Trinidadians and Tobagonians of Indian descent with Overseas Citizenship of India.

Bilateral agreements

Indian Business companies in Trinidad and Tobago

 Bank of Baroda
 New India Assurance Company

 Arcelor Mittal Steel Plant
 Intercommercial Bank Limited

Diplomacy

Of India
 Port of Spain (High Commission)

Of Trinidad and Tobago
New Delhi (High Commission)

See also 

Indo-Trinidadian
 Hinduism in Trinidad and Tobago
Islam in Trinidad and Tobago

References

External links

 
Trinidad
Bilateral relations of Trinidad and Tobago